The binding constant, or affinity constant/association constant, is a special case of the equilibrium constant K, and is the inverse of the dissociation constant. It is associated with the binding and unbinding reaction of receptor (R) and ligand (L) molecules, which is formalized as:

R + L  RL

The reaction is characterized by the on-rate constant kon and the off-rate constant koff, which have units of M−1 s−1 and s−1, respectively. In equilibrium, the forward binding transition R + L → RL should be balanced by the backward unbinding transition RL → R + L. That is, 

,

where [R], [L] and [RL] represent the concentration of unbound free receptors, the concentration of unbound free ligand and the concentration of receptor-ligand complexes. The binding constant Ka is defined by

.

An often considered quantity is the dissociation constant Kd ≡ , which has the unit of concentration, despite the fact that strictly speaking, all association constants are unitless values. The inclusion of units arises from the simplification that such constants are calculated solely from concentrations, which is not the case. Once chemical activity is factored into the correct form of the equation, a dimensionless value is obtained. For the binding of receptor and ligand molecules in solution, the molar Gibbs free energy ΔG, or the binding affinity is related to the dissociation constant Kd via

,

in which R is the ideal gas constant, T temperature and the standard reference concentration co = 1 mol/L.

See also 

 Binding coefficient

Equilibrium chemistry